Sittace or Sittake or Sittakê (Greek: , Ptol. vi. 1. § 6; Akkadian Sattagū), was an ancient city, the capital of ancient Sittacene, in Assyria, at the southern end of this province, on the road between Artemita and Susa. (Strabo xvi. p. 744.) It is called Sitta by Diodorus (xvii. 110). William Smith believed that Diodorus's Sambana also referred to Sittace.

The origin of the city's name may be found in Babylonian tablets referring to the polity "URU.Sattagû" which may be a translation or approximation of "people of Sattagydia", a Persian satrapy. 

The district of Sittacene appears to have been called in later times "Apolloniatis" (Strab. xi. p. 524).

Notes

References

Sittacene
Ancient Assyrian cities
Former populated places in Iraq